Jimbaran is a fishing village and tourist resort in Bali, Indonesia. Located south of Ngurah Rai International Airport, the beach has seafood restaurants and luxury hotels, including the five-star Le Méridien Bali Jimbaran, Kayumanis Private Estate & Spa, Intercontinental Hotel Bali, AYANA Resort and Spa Bali, Four Seasons and Jimbaran Puri Bali and the casual dining restaurant Cuca. Lately, Jimbaran is developing more affordable accommodations.

Tourism in Jimbaran has increased in recent years which has boosted the local economy. In 2005 the Bali bombings occurred when suicide bombers struck at two popular warungs (restaurants) along the beach. However, the tourism industry has since recovered. Diners select the live seafood that they wish to eat, and it is immediately prepared, generally grilled over a fire of coconut husks rather than charcoal.

It is administered under Kuta South District along with Nusa Dua peninsula.

Jimbaran lies on the 'neck' of the southern peninsula in Bali.

Villages
 
 
Cengiling

References

External links
 
 

Populated places in Bali
Beaches of Bali
Restaurant districts and streets
Tourism in Bali